Jai Pal Singh (13 May 1930 – 24 September 1997) was an Indian physician and educator. Singh obtained his bachelor’s medical degree in 1962 Sarojini Naidu Medical College, Agra, India - the same institute from where his father (Yogendra Singh, a doctor with the British Army) graduated a generation ago. After completing his post-graduate qualifications in Surgery in 1955 , he worked for over 40 years in Delhi and its neighbouring regions. 

His last official position was as Director of what was then Rohtak Medical College & Hospital in Haryana and is now Pt. B. D. Sharma PGIMS Rohtak the only tertiary care and medical teaching facility in the state of Haryana.

Professional career

Singh earned recognition for his work in surgery and was appointed as Honorary Surgeon to two Presidents of India and was honored by President of India Padma Shri by in 1991.

Teaching experience

1953–1955	Clinical Tutor, S.N. Medical College, Agra
1955–1958	Registrar (Surgery), lady Irwin Hospital, New Delhi
1959–1979	Honorary Assistant Professor of Surgery, Lady Hardinge Medical College and The *Willingdon Hospital, New Delhi (Supervisor for Master of Surgery since 1968)
1980–1986	Professor, University of Delhi at University College of Medical Sciences, Safdarjung Hospital and Dr. Ram Manohar Lohia Hospital, New Delhi

Other awards
Recipient of the Hari Om Ashram Prerit Award in 1986 for the best piece of Surgical Research on "Newer Aetriopathologoical aspects of Urinary Calculi and means of preventing their recurrence".

References 

1930 births
1997 deaths
Indian surgeons
People from Meerut district
Indian medical academics
Recipients of the Padma Shri in medicine
Indian medical administrators
20th-century Indian medical doctors
Sarojini Naidu Medical College alumni
Dr. Bhimrao Ambedkar University alumni
20th-century surgeons